Joseph Collins may refer to:

Joseph Henry Collins (1841–1916), British mining engineer
Joseph Collins (neurologist) (1866–1950), American neurologist
J. Lawton Collins (1896–1987), U.S. Army general
Joseph Collins (boxer) (1919–1984), New Zealand boxer
Joseph T. Collins (1939–2012), American herpetologist
Joe Collins (1922–1989), baseball player
Joe Collins (American football), American football player for the University of Notre Dame, 1908–1909
Joseph Collins (American football) (born 1988), American football wide receiver